The Irish Women's Franchise League was an organisation for women's suffrage which was set up in Dublin in November 1908. Its founder members included Hanna Sheehy-Skeffington, Margaret Cousins, Francis Sheehy-Skeffington and James H. Cousins. Thomas MacDonagh was a member.

Its paper was The Irish Citizen, which was published from 1912 to 1920. The paper was edited originally by Francis Sheehy-Skeffington and James Cousins. One of its reporters throughout was Lillian Metge, who founded the Lisburn Suffrage Society and was its president and secretary at different times.

History
In the early 20th century the Irish Parliamentary Party under John Redmond and his deputy John Dillon was opposed to votes for women, as was the British prime minister, Asquith.

In November 1908, Hanna Sheehy-Skeffington and Margaret Cousins, along with their husbands Francis and James, founded the Irish Women’s Franchise League. 

In June 1912, after a meeting of a number of women's organisations, Hanna Sheehy-Skeffington and Margaret Cousins with six other members of the IWFL smashed government windows in the GPO and other government buildings. They were arrested, charged, and jailed. The following month Asquith came on a visit to Dublin to address a meeting in the Theatre Royal. Frank Sheehy-Skeffington managed to gain entrance and demanded votes for women before being thrown out, while Asquith's carriage was attacked by British suffragists Mary Leigh and Gladys Evans. In that attack John Redmond was injured. The British women went on hunger-strike in Mountjoy Prison, and were joined by the imprisoned Irish IWFL members in solidarity. In March 1913 a bust of John Redmond in the Royal Hibernian Academy was defaced by a suffragist protesting against the failure of the Irish Parliamentary Party to support a Women's Franchise Bill in the House of Commons. In contrast, as a mark of solidarity with the women, James Connolly travelled from Belfast to Dublin to speak at one of the IWFL's weekly meetings which was held in the Phoenix Park, and members of the ITGWU provided protection and offered escorts to women as they left the meetings.

Hanna Sheehy-Skeffington lost her teaching job in 1913 when she was arrested and put in prison for three months after throwing stones at Dublin Castle. Whilst in jail she started a hunger strike but was released under the Prisoner's Temporary Discharge of Ill Health Act and was soon rearrested.

The league kept a neutral stance on Home Rule, but was opposed to the World War. After the execution of Francis Sheehy-Skeffington by the British during the Easter Rising of 1916, it supported Sinn Féin.

Following the introduction of women's suffrage in Ireland at the 1918 Irish general election (for women over the age of 30), and the dramatic political events in Ireland that followed it, the organisation naturally lost momentum and purpose, and was shortly defunct thereafter.

Notable members
 Mrs Charles Oldham was the first president
 Mrs Hannah Skeffington was the first secretary
 Margaret Cousins was the first treasurer
 Jenny Wyse Power joined about 1916
 Cissie Cahalan served thrice as president, and was one of the few working-class women in the movement
 Rosamund Jacob
Marguerite Palmer, honorary secretary
Marjorie Hasler joined in 1910, sentenced to jail for breaking windows, many consider her early death as a direct result of her imprisonment and is considered "the first Irish martyr for the suffragette cause"
 Edith Young active in the Galway branch
Lillian Metge active in the Lisburn branch, and reporter for the Irish Citizen, was given Hunger Strike Medal after imprisonment for explosion at Lisburn Cathedral, but released without sentence as the World War One was imminent
Patricia Hoey, the first president of the London branch of the IWFL

See also
List of suffragists and suffragettes
List of women's rights activists
List of women's rights organizations
Timeline of women's suffrage
Women's suffrage organizations

References

1908 establishments in Ireland
Voter rights and suffrage organizations
Women's organisations based in Ireland
Women's suffrage in Ireland